VSD is a French weekly news, celebrity and leisure magazine, published on Thursdays in France. The name is formed from the first letters of the French names for Friday (Vendredi), Saturday (Samedi) and Sunday (Dimanche).

History and profile
VSD was first published on 9 September 1977 by Maurice Siegel. After Siegel's death in 1985, direction passed to his sons François and Jean-Dominique. Publication ceased in August 1995. The title was purchased by Prisma Presse, a media subsidiary of the German company Bertelsmann and relaunched in June 1996. Like its rival Paris Match it relies heavily on paparazzi photography and celebrity news. VSD is published on a weekly basis.

Circulation
The circulation of VSD in the 1980s reached 400,000 copies. The 1998 circulation of the weekly was 235,000 copies.

In 2001 VSD had a circulation of 216,000 copies. The magazine had a circulation of 204,036 copies in 2005 and 197,482 copies in 2006. Its circulation grew to 217,751 copies in 2007, but fell to 193,208 copies in 2008. It further fell to 152,221 copies in 2009.

References

External links
Official Website

1977 establishments in France
Celebrity magazines
French-language magazines
Magazines established in 1977
Magazines published in Paris
Weekly magazines published in France
Prisma Media